Luque is a city in Central Department of Paraguay, part of the Gran Asunción metropolitan area. Both 1635 and 1750 have been recorded as dates of its founding.
It was temporarily the capital of Paraguay in 1868 during the Paraguayan War before relocation to San Estanislao. Luque is one of the most important cities in the country. The city counts as home of Paraguay's main international airport, Silvio Pettirossi International Airport and the Ñu Guasú Park, which is where the Paraguayan Olympic Committee is also located. The continental governing body of association football in South America, CONMEBOL, has its headquarters approximately 3 minutes from the Airport, consisting of the South American Football Museum and walking distance from the Bourbon CONMEBOL Asunción Convention Hotel. When it existed, ARPA – Aerolíneas Paraguayas had its headquarters in the ARPA Terminal on the grounds of the airport. It is a center of production of Guitars and Paraguayan harps as well as Filigranas, gold and silver filigree jewelry including the seven-band ring Carretón de Siete Ramales. On 27 January 2016, Paraguayan Newspaper La Nación had reported that Carlos Echeverría Estigarribia, the elected intendent of the city of Luque, states his intention of wanting Luque to be one of the most important cities.

Toponymy
The name Luque is first mentioned in 1635, in an act of the Cabildo of Asunción when the colonial governor of the Governorate of Paraguay, Martín Ledesma de Valderrama, granted two leagues of land to a Spanish Captain named Miguel Antón de Luque in a place near Asunción known as las Salinas. According to the act this was the place where Captain Antón de Luque had been working an Encomienda for more than twenty years.

A century later, in 1743, another Miguel de Luque, a descendant of the first mentioned, made a donation by testament of a section of those lands to the Franciscans who built a chapel for the devotion of the Virgin of the Rosary in 1750 - 1755, and from that time the old name of Salinas was changed to Valle de Luque.

In 1781, governor Pedro Melo de Portugal made the first administrative division of the Governorate of Paraguay into six towns and designated the district with the name Partido de Luque.

Geography
The city of Luque extends from Ypacaraí Lake to the western bank of the Paraguay River.

Luque is located to the East of Asunción and borders the following cities:
 To the North with Mariano Roque Alonso, Limpio and Nueva Colombia 
 To the South with Fernando de la Mora and San Lorenzo
 To the East with Areguá
 To the West with Asunción
 To the Southeast with Capiatá

Demography

Luque is the third-most populated city of Paraguay, after the capital city and Ciudad del Este.  It is the most populated city of the Central Department of Paraguay.

Gallery

Twin towns
Luque is twinned with:
 Ituzaingó, Buenos Aires, Argentina
 San Juan Bautista, Paraguay
 Luque, Spain

Notable people
 Ansoni Lemans
 José Luis Chilavert
 Egni Eckert
 Raúl Vicente Amarilla
 Pablo César Aguilar
 Osvaldo Martínez
 Hilarión Osorio

See also
 Ñu Guasú Park

References

Populated places in the Central Department
Geography of Asunción